Pamelina is an extinct genus of basal kuehneosaurid known from Early Triassic (Olenekian age) rocks of Czatkowice 1, Poland. It was first named by Susan E. Evans in 2009 and the type species is Pamelina polonica. It is the oldest known member of Kuehneosauridae. The vertebrae have characteristics consistent with gliding or parachuting.

Phylogeny 
Cladogram after Evans (2009).

References

Triassic lepidosauromorphs
Fossil taxa described in 2009
Early Triassic reptiles of Europe
Prehistoric reptile genera